Huitaca boyacaensis is a species of neotropical harvestmen in the family Neogoveidae, first described by Ligia Benavides and Gonzalo Giribet in 2013.

Taxonomy 
Huitaca boyacaensis used to be placed in the family of Ogoveidae (2003) but is reclassified under Neogoveidae (2007).

Etymology and habitat 

Both the genus Huitaca and the species epithet boyacaensis are named after the culture of the Muisca; Huitaca was the rebelling goddess of sexual liberation in the Muisca religion and Boyacá is one of the departments of Colombia where the Muisca lived.

Nineteen paratype specimens have been collected at the same location; eight males, six females and five juveniles.

Description 
Large species with an anterior opisthosomal sternal complex of themale consisting of three digit-like apophyses pointing backward, densely ornamented with conspicuous gland openings. The sternal organ seems to be homologous to Huitaca ventralis and Huitaca tama. The male specimen has a dark brown body with lighter legs.

See also 

 List of flora and fauna named after the Muisca
 Huitaca

References

Bibliography 
 
 

Harvestmen
Endemic fauna of Colombia
Arthropods of Colombia
Altiplano Cundiboyacense
Huitaca
Animals described in 2013